Specchia Gallone is a small Italian town close to the Adriatic coast and about 40 km distant from Lecce. Administratively it counts as a frazione of the commune of Minervino di Lecce, and falls within the province of Lecce in the Apulia region of south-east Italy.

Cities and towns in Apulia
Frazioni of the Province of Lecce
Localities of Salento